Something to Swing About is a 1960 album by jazz singer Carmen McRae, arranged by Ernie Wilkins.

Reception

The initial Billboard magazine review from January 1960 wrote that "McRae fans are going to like this and the gal can easily make herself new friend with the set. ...This is Miss McRae in top form". Allmusic awarded the album three and a half stars, but did not review the album.

Track listing
 "I See Your Face Before Me" (Arthur Schwartz, Howard Dietz)
 "A Sleepin' Bee" (Harold Arlen, Truman Capote)
 "Comes Love" (Sam H. Stept, Lew Brown, Charles Tobias)
 "Three Little Words" (Harry Ruby, Bert Kalmar)
 "It's Love" (Leonard Bernstein, Betty Comden, Adolph Green)
 "(How Little It Matters) How Little We Know" (Philip Springer, Carolyn Leigh)
 "You Leave Me Breathless" (Frederick Hollander, Ralph Freed)
 "Love Is a Simple Thing" (Arthur Siegel, June Carroll)
 "I Couldn't Care Less" (Rogers L. Simon)
 "Falling in Love with Love" (Richard Rodgers, Lorenz Hart)
 "That's for Me" (Rodgers, Oscar Hammerstein II)

Personnel
Carmen McRae - vocals
Ernie Wilkins - arranger, musical director
Vinnie Dean, Porter Kilbert, Phil Woods - alto saxophone
Budd Johnson, Zoot Sims - tenor saxophone
Vinny Victor, Sol Schlinger - baritone saxophone
Richard Williams, Al Stewart, Art Farmer, Lennie Johnson, Jimmy Maxwell, Ernie Royal - trumpet
Billy Byers, Jimmy Cleveland, Mickey Gravine, Urbie Green, Frank Rehak - trombone
Paul Fauline - bass trombone
Dick Katz - piano 
Tommy Williams - double bass
Floyd Williams, Don Lamond - drums

References

1960 albums
Albums arranged by Ernie Wilkins
Carmen McRae albums
Kapp Records albums